The Zambia Catholic University (ZCU) is located along Ntundwe Drive, Kalulushi, Zambia.

The University opened in April 2008.  As of 2011, degrees could be earned in education, development studies, business administration, economics, banking and finance, accountancy, human resource management and business information technology.  In January 2017, the University has was accredited by the Higher Education Authority. 

Extracurricular activities include rowing, football, basketball, volleyball, bocce ball, the Utopian university magazine, the Social Action Committee and student unions for Catholics and non-Catholics.

References

External links 
Zambia Catholic University Official Website

Universities in Zambia
Educational institutions established in 2008
2008 establishments in Zambia
Buildings and structures in Copperbelt Province